Kinross and Western Perthshire was a county constituency of the House of Commons of the Parliament of the United Kingdom from 1918 until 1983, representing, at any one time, a seat for one Member of Parliament (MP), elected by the first past the post system of election.

Boundaries

The constituency was first defined by the Representation of the People Act 1918, and first used in the 1918 general election, as one of two county constituencies covering the county of Kinross and the county of Perth. The other was the Perth constituency.

Prior to the 1918 election the county of Kinross was covered, nominally, by Clackmannanshire and Kinross-shire, which also covered, nominally, the county of Clackmannan, and the county of Perth was covered, nominally, by  Eastern Perthshire,  Perth (as a burgh constituency) and Western Perthshire. Constituency boundaries were defined in terms of the Representation of the People (Scotland) Act 1832 and the Redistribution of Seats Act 1885 and, by these terms, five detached parishes of the county of Perth and one detached parish of the county of Stirling were within the Clackmannanshire and Kinross-shire constituency. Also, by 1918, for local government purposes, under legislation dating from 1889, county boundaries throughout most of Scotland had been redrawn, and detached parishes had become generally historic.

The Representation of the People Act 1918 took account of new local government boundaries in definitions of new constituency boundaries, and the Kinross and Western Perthshire constituency was defined as covering the county of Kinross and the Central, Highland and Western districts of the county of Perth, including the county of Perth burghs of Aberfeldy, Auchterarder, Callander, Crieff, Doune and Dunblane.

1918 boundaries were used also for the general elections of 1922, 1923, 1924, 1929, 1931, 1935 and 1945.

A by-election was held for this seat in 1938 after The Duchess of Atholl resigned her seat in opposition to Neville Chamberlain's policy of appeasement.

For the 1950 general election, as a result of the House of Commons (Redistribution of Seats) Act 1949, the Perth constituency became Perth and East Perthshire, but boundaries were unaltered. 1950 names and boundaries were used also for the general elections of 1951, 1955, 1959, 1964, 1966 and 1970. This also applied to the by-election of late 1963, when newly elected prime minister Sir Alec Douglas-Home won the seat after renouncing his peerage in order to rejoin the House of Commons.

For the February 1974 general election, as a result of the Second Periodical Review of the Boundary Commission, there were minor alterations to the boundaries of the Kinross and West Perthshire constituency and the Perth and East Perthshire constituency. Kinross and West Perthshire was defined as covering the county of Kinross and the Central, Highland and Western districts of the county of Perth, including the county of Perth burghs of Aberfeldy, Auchterarder, Callander, Crieff, Doune, Dunblane and Pitlochry.

February 1974 boundaries were used also in the general elections of October 1974 and 1979.

In 1975, under the Local Government (Scotland) Act 1973, counties and burghs throughout Scotland had been abolished in favour of regions and districts and islands council areas. The county of Kinross and most of the county of Perth had been merged into the Tayside region. The burghs of Callander, Doune, and Dunblane in the county of Perth, the Perth parish of Muckhart and the Western district of the county (except the electoral division of Ardoch) had been merged into the Central region.

New constituency boundaries, taking account of new local government boundaries, were adopted for the 1983 general election. Constituencies defined to cover the Tayside region included Perth and Kinross, and constituencies designed to cover the Central region included Stirling.

Members of Parliament

Election results

Elections in the 1910s

Elections in the 1920s

Elections in the 1930s

General Election 1939–40:

Another General Election was due to take place before the end of 1940. The political parties had been making preparations for that election and by autumn 1939, the following candidates had been selected:
Unionist: William McNair Snadden
Liberal: Mary Isabella MacDonald

Elections in the 1940s

Elections in the 1950s

Elections in the 1960s

Elections in the 1970s

Notes and references 

Historic parliamentary constituencies in Scotland (Westminster)
Constituencies of the Parliament of the United Kingdom established in 1918
Constituencies of the Parliament of the United Kingdom disestablished in 1983
Constituencies of the Parliament of the United Kingdom represented by a sitting Prime Minister